James Butler Jr. (born December 18, 1972) is an American former professional boxer who competed from 1996 to 2004. He challenged once for the IBF super middleweight title in 2000, but he is best known for his infamous bout on November 23, 2001. Butler brutally sucker punched Richard Grant after losing the fight and served four months at Rikers Island. In 2004, Butler was arrested for the murder of Sam Kellerman and was sentenced to 29 years and four months in prison.

Biography 
Butler started off his career by scoring 18 wins and only 1 loss in the super middleweight division. This led to a title fight against Sven Ottke who beat Butler by unanimous decision.

Butler's next bout earned him infamy on November 23, 2001, at the Roseland Ballroom in Manhattan, New York. The bout was a charity event to benefit surviving New York firemen and police officers of the September 11, 2001 terrorist attacks in New York City and was televised live on ESPN2's Friday Night Fights. Butler faced Richard "The Alien" Grant, a fighter who had decisioned him early in his career. After losing the rematch by unanimous decision, Butler had his gloves removed before the announcement of the winner, Grant then went to Butler's side of the ring for an expected exchange of congratulations. Instead, Butler sucker-punched Grant, nailing a bare-handed right hook to his jaw. Grant suffered a temporarily dislocated jaw and a lacerated tongue that required 26 stitches. Butler was arrested and charged with second degree assault. Butler was later convicted and served four months at Rikers Island detention facility.

Butler's last bout was a split-decision loss on August 10, 2004, to Omar Sheika.

Murder of Sam Kellerman and conviction 

On October 12, 2004, writer Sam Kellerman (brother of sports analyst Max Kellerman) was killed at his apartment in Los Angeles. His body was not found until October 17. Butler was considered a suspect since he had been friends with Kellerman for over 10 years.

On October 20, Butler, accompanied by a lawyer, sought treatment for his alleged bipolar disorder.

Butler was arrested for the Kellerman murder on October 27. Two days later, he pleaded not guilty to murder and arson. He was held on $1.25 million bail. Prosecutors claimed that Butler, the only suspect in the case, repeatedly struck Kellerman in the head with a hammer then torched Kellerman's Hollywood, California apartment in an attempted cover-up.

On July 8, 2005, a Los Angeles judge ruled there was sufficient evidence for Butler to stand trial on charges of murder and arson.

On March 27, 2006, Butler pleaded guilty to voluntary manslaughter and arson in the 2004 death of Kellerman. On April 5, Butler was sentenced to 29 years and four months in prison by Superior Court Judge Michael Pastor, according to Deputy Public Defender Jack Keenan.

Prosecutors speculated Butler was having relationship issues with his girlfriend while also struggling to revive his boxing career when Kellerman asked Butler to move out. A disagreement ensued on how long Butler could stay when he picked up a hammer and killed Kellerman then torched his house.

Professional boxing record

References

External links 
 
James Butler Deserves Ban From Boxing
Video of James Butler's sucker punch against Richard Grant

1972 births
African-American boxers
Light-heavyweight boxers
American people convicted of assault
American people convicted of manslaughter
American sportspeople convicted of crimes
Living people
Sportspeople from Manhattan
American people convicted of arson
Prisoners and detainees of California
American male boxers
Prisoners and detainees of New York (state)
Boxers from New York City
21st-century African-American sportspeople
20th-century African-American sportspeople